Lippmann Moses Büschenthal (12 May 1782 – 27 December 1818) was a Franco-German rabbi, poet and dramatist of the Haskalah movement. 
He was born in the Alsatian town of Bischheim, near Strasbourg, on 12 May 1782. In 1799 he married Debora Auerbach, granddaughter of Rabbi David Sinzheim, with whom he had four children (they would later divorce in 1813). After a short stay in Paris (1807), he left Alsace for Germany, settling first in Neuwied and then Elberfeld, where he worked as a newspaper editor. He then lived in Vienna and Breslau, before finally settling in Berlin shortly before his death.

Büschenthal published mainly poetry in Hebrew and German, and one dramatic work. He composed psalms in Hebrew for the Jewish community of Strasbourg in 1801 on the occasion of an attempt on Napoleon's life, and in 1803 on the occasion of the war against England. Many of his works were published in the journals Sulamith, Jedidja and Rheinische Blätter. A collection of short tales was published posthumously.

Bibliography 

 
 
  With W. Heidenheim.
 
 
 
 
 
 
 
 
 
 Hebrew translation of Friedrich Schiller's An die Freude. Berlin. 1817.
 Preface to 's Streifereien im Gebiete des Ernstes und des Scherzes. Berlin. 1818.
 
  Tragedy in five acts.

References 

 
 
 Kathrin Wittler: Politics of Language, Politics of Genre, and Jewish Authorship. Multilingual Panegyric Odes and German ‘Mother Tongue’ Songs in Napoleonic Europe. In: Mapping Multilingualism in 19th Century European Literatures. Le plurilinguisme dans les littératures européennes du XIXe siècle. Ed. by Olga Anokhina, Till Dembeck, and Dirk Weissmann. LIT, Berlin 2019, ISBN 978-3-643-91098-1, pp. 99–124.

1782 births
1818 deaths
19th-century French Jews
19th-century French poets
19th-century French rabbis
19th-century German rabbis
Alsatian Jews
French writers in German
German male poets
German poets
Hebrew-language poets
Jewish comedy writers
Jewish dramatists and playwrights
Jewish poets
Jewish translators
People from Bas-Rhin
People of the Haskalah